N. John Habraken (born 29 October 1928, Bandung, Dutch East Indies) is a Dutch architect, educator, and theorist. His theoretical contributions are in the field of user participation in mass housing, the integration of users and residents into the design process. The visual result of his theory is the architecture of lively variety. Habraken is the initiator of the international "Participation movement" in architecture. His book "Supports: An Alternative to Mass Housing", first published in 1961, is the manifesto and starting point of this movement. The theme "Resident or user participation" has been linked to Structuralism and Open building.

Biography 

Habraken studied architecture at Delft Technical University, the Netherlands from 1948-1955. From 1965 to 1975, he was Director of SAR (Foundation for Architects Research) in the Netherlands, researching and developing methods for the design and construction of adaptable housing. In his seminal book "Supports" Habraken proposes the separation of "Supports" or base buildings from "Infills" in residential construction and design as a means of giving inhabitants a meaningful participative role in the design process. According to Habraken the implementation of his theory into practice is left to the decision of "the architects".

In 1960, Habraken designed the WOBO (World Bottle) for Alfred Heineken. The WOBO is a stackable beer bottle that can be used to build a bottle wall. Initially developed in response to the lack of affordable building materials and the inadequate living conditions that beset Curaçao's lower class, the WOBO is a pioneering example of industrialized recycling and adaptive reuse of materials.

In 1967 Habraken was appointed professor at Eindhoven University of Technology, and charged with the responsibility to set up its new Department of Architecture and serve as its first chairperson. From 1975 to 1981 Habraken served as Head of the Department of Architecture at the Massachusetts Institute of Technology (MIT), Cambridge, MA. He taught at MIT until his retirement as Professor Emeritus in 1989.

Habraken remains occupied with methods and theory of architectural and urban design. He has lectured on these topics worldwide and is the author of a vast number of books, research reports, and many articles. His book "The Structure of the Ordinary" is an investigation of laws governing the built environment as revealed by patterns of transformation. His most recent book, "Palladio’s Children" is an attempt to explain why architects do not know how to deal with everyday environment.

Habraken lives in Apeldoorn, the Netherlands.

Awards and honors 

Habraken is recipient of the 1988 Creative Achievement Award of the Association of Collegiate Schools in the US; the David Roëll prize 1979 of the Dutch Prince Bernhard Fund; The King Fahd award for design and research in Islamic Architecture, 1985–86; and the Oeuvre Award for 1996 of the National Foundation for Art, design, and Architecture (BKVB oeuvre prijs) in the Netherlands. He is honorary member of the Architectural Institute of Japan, Knight of the Royal Order of the Dutch Lion 2003, and Recipient of the 2003 "Kubus Award for Advancing the Standing of Architecture", by the BNA, Dutch Association of Architects.

Urban ensembles – possibilities and limitations 

2012, Almere housing estate Homeruskwartier, "Mix of styles", master plan and coordination by OMA. The houses are designed by various architects and residents. Because the Homeruskwartier has very different architectural styles and building ensembles, it could be interesting for the discussion about "Possibilities and Limitations", see References below. In the map Almere, the participatory project is on the left side, a circular plan. (Homeruskwartier: 0,1 from left / 0,7 from above)

2013, The Hague housing estate Bomenbuurt, participatory project with buildings by famous architects (Hendrik Berlage, Jan Duiker et al.). The residential area Bomenbuurt was planned by Berlage in 1908. Hundred years later municipal officials launched a participatory project. As a result, residents and architects protested against "unaesthetic" extensions on buildings and in private gardens of this area with a special cultural value. (Bomenbuurt: 0,3 from left / 0,4 from above)

Publications

Soportes: Vivienda y Ciudad / Supports: Housing and City, N. John Habraken & Andrés Mignucci, Essays on Supports, Thematic Design and architectural education as part of the Laboratorio de Vivienda del Siglo XXI at  ETSAB Barcelona School of Architecture. Introduction by Josep Maria Montaner and Zaida Muxí, Barcelona: Universitat Politècnica de Catalunya-BarcelonaTECH, 2009.
Palladio’s Children, Seven essays on the everyday environment and the architect. Edited by Jonathan Teicher, Taylor and Francis, London, New York, 2005.
The Structure of the Ordinary, Cambridge, London, MIT Press, 1998
The Appearance of the Form, Cambridge, Awater Press,1985. Private edition. Second ed. 1988.
Transformations of the Site, Cambridge, Awater Press, 1983. Private edition. Second ed. 1988.
The Grunsfeld Variations: A demonstration project on the coordination of a design team in urban design. N. John Habraken with J.A. Aldrete-Haas, R. Chow, T. Hille, P. Krugmeier, M. Lampkin, A. Mallows, A Mignucci, Y. Takase, K. Weller, T. Yokouchi. Cambridge, MIT Laboratory for Architecture and Planning, 1981.
General Principles about the Way Built Environments Exist, Open House BCB series, SAR, Eindhoven, 1979.
Variations, the Systematic Design of Supports, with J.T.Boekholt, A.P.Thyssen, P.J.M. Dinjens: MIT Laboratory for Architecture and Planning; distributed by MIT Press, Cambridge, USA and London 1976. English translation by W. Wiewel and Sue Gibbons from the original Dutch publication: Denken in Varianten, Alphen a/d Rijn, Samson, 1974.
Three R's for Housing, Amsterdam, Scheltema & Holkema, 1970; originally published in Forum, vol. XX, no 1, 1966.
Supports - An Alternative to Mass Housing, London 1972. Manifesto of the participation movement. First edition in Dutch: De dragers en de mensen - Het einde van de massawoningbouw, Amsterdam 1961. Further editions: Italian 1974, Spanish 1975, German 2000 (with illustrations).

References

 Le Corbusier, La Ville Radieuse, Boulogne-sur-Seine, 1935. Project "Fort l'Empereur" in Algiers, housing estate with participation of the residents, well-known perspective drawing on page 247.
 Koos Bosma, Housing for the Millions: John Habraken and the SAR (1960-2000), Rotterdam 2000
 Arnulf Luchinger, 2-Komponenten-Bauweise (Two Components Approach), in combination with Die Träger und die Menschen (Supports) by John Habraken, The Hague 2000.
 Israel Nagore Setién, Open Building in the Collective Housing of the 21st Century: POSSIBILITIES AND LIMITATIONS, Kingston University London 2012.

External links
 Habraken's official website
 De Drager Video: Interviews with architects and residents about Supports: An Alternative to Mass Housing

1928 births
Living people
Dutch architects
People from Bandung
Delft University of Technology alumni
Dutch expatriates in Indonesia